Berberine reductase is an enzyme that catalyzes the chemical reaction

(R)-canadine + 2 NADP+  berberine + 2 NADPH + H+

Thus, the two substrates of this enzyme are (R)-canadine and nicotinamide adenine dinucleotide phosphate ion, whereas its 3 products are berberine, nicotinamide adenine dinucleotide phosphate, and hydrogen ion.

This enzyme belongs to the family of oxidoreductases, specifically those acting on the CH-NH group of donors with NAD+ or NADP+ as acceptor.  The systematic name of this enzyme class is (R)-tetrahydroberberine:NADP+ oxidoreductase. This enzyme is also called (R)-canadine synthase.

References

 

EC 1.5.1
NADPH-dependent enzymes
Enzymes of unknown structure

sr:Flavin reduktaza